Zhou Zhicheng (born 22 June 1963) is a Chinese engineer who is a professor and dean of the School of Aerospace Science and Engineering, Sichuan University, and currently director of Communication Satellite Division of China Aerospace Science and Technology Corporation.

Biography 
Zhou was born in Pinggu County, Beijing, on 22 June 1963. In 1980, he entered Chengdu University of Science and Technology (now Sichuan University), graduating in 1984 with a Bachelor of Engineering degree. He received a Master of Engineering degree from Tsinghua University in 1987 and a Doctor of Engineering from China Aerospace Science and Technology Corporation in 2008.

In 1987, he joined the 501st Department, China Aerospace Science and Technology Corporation as an engineer. He was chief commander and chief designer of Dongfanghong-4 satellite, deputy chief designer of Beidou-1 satellite, and chief designer of Xinnuo-2 satellite. On 25 March 2019, he was engaged by Sichuan University as dean of the School of Aerospace Science and Engineering.

Honours and awards 
 1993 State Science and Technology Progress Award (Third Class)
 2003 State Science and Technology Progress Award (First Class)
 2011 State Science and Technology Progress Award (Second Class)
 2016 State Technological Invention Award (Second Class)
 27 November 2017 Member of the Chinese Academy of Engineering (CAE)
 November 2018 Science and Technology Progress Award of the Ho Leung Ho Lee Foundation

References 

1963 births
Living people
Engineers from Beijing
Sichuan University alumni
Tsinghua University alumni
Academic staff of Sichuan University
Members of the Chinese Academy of Engineering